Banta is a genus of skippers in the family Hesperiidae.

Species
Banta anna (Evans, 1935)
Banta banta Evans, 1949
Banta fulvomargo (Joicey & Noakes, 1916)
Banta linnei de Jong, 2008

References
Natural History Museum Lepidoptera genus database
Notes on some skippers of the Taractrocera-group (Lepidoptera: Hesperiidae: Hesperiinae) from New Guinea
Banta at funet

Hesperiinae
Hesperiidae genera